Francis Green may refer to:

 Francis Green (footballer) (born 1980), English football striker
 Francis C. Green (1835–1905), American soldier and Medal of Honor recipient
 Francis Harvey Green (1861–1951), American educator, poet and lecturer
 Francis Joseph Green (1906–1995), American prelate of the Roman Catholic Church

See also 
 Frank Green (disambiguation)
 Francis Vinton Greene (1850–1921), United States Army general